West Side Avenue is a station on the Hudson–Bergen Light Rail (HBLR) in the West Side neighborhood in Jersey City, Hudson County, New Jersey. Located on the east side of West Side Avenue, the station is the terminal of the West Side Avenue branch of the Hudson–Bergen Light Rail, with service to Tonnelle Avenue station in North Bergen. The station consists of a single island platform and a pair of tracks that end at the station. The station contains a pedestrian bridge over West Side Avenue to a small parking lot and bus stop on the west side of the street. The station is accessible for handicapped people per the Americans with Disabilities Act of 1990, with an elevator in the pedestrian overpass and train-level platforms. West Side Avenue station opened on April 15, 2000 as part of the original operating segment of the Hudson–Bergen Light Rail.

History
West Side Avenue station is located on the site of a station with the same name used by the Central Railroad of New Jersey. The original station was established in 1869 as part of the Newark and New York Railroad at the crossing for Mallory Avenue (Hudson County Route 611). The stop, known as West Bergen was moved in the late 1870s to West Side Avenue. A two-story wooden depot was built at West Side Avenue  and an eastbound brick station measuring  came in 1910. Service at West Side Avenue, which went to Lafayette Street Terminal in Newark became truncated on February 3, 1946 when a steamship collided with the bridge over the Hackensack River, eliminating two spans. The station lost passenger service on May 6, 1948 when service on the branch ended.

The new station opened on April 15, 2000. 

After two years of studies, in May 2011, NJT announced its plan for 0.7 mile extension of the line. The new track would be laid along an elevated viaduct from the West Side Avenue station, across Route 440 to the northern end of the proposed Bayfront redevelopment area, where a new station would be constructed. The trip between the two stations would take 1 minute and 50 seconds. The project, eligible for federal funding, is estimated to cost at $171.6 million. In December 2017, NJ Transit approved a $5 million preliminary engineering contract for the extension project.

In early 2019, it was announced that the West Side Avenue, Martin Luther King Drive, and Garfield Avenue stations on the West Side Branch would close for nine months starting in June 2019 for repairs to a sewer line running along the right-of-way. During that time, replacement service was provided by NJ Transit shuttle buses. Service to the station was restored on May 23, 2020.

Station layout

The station is on an embankment above the east side of street, and consists of an island platform and two tracks. Bumper blocks are at the west end of the station while the platform continues with a pedestrian bridge and elevator connecting it to a large park and ride lot and bus station. It is built along the former Central Railroad of New Jersey's Newark and New York Railroad right of way that continued west across Newark Bay.

Vicinity
New Jersey City University
Droyer's Point
Bayfront
Greenville, Jersey City
St. Mark Coptic Orthodox Church
Henry Snyder High School
A. Harry Moore School*
Jersey City Board of Education

Bibliography

References

External links

 West Side Avenue entrance from Google Maps Street View

Hudson-Bergen Light Rail stations
Transportation in Jersey City, New Jersey
Railway stations in the United States opened in 2000
2000 establishments in New Jersey
Former Central Railroad of New Jersey stations